Paul Kühnle (10 April 1885 – 28 December 1970) was a German international footballer.

References

1885 births
1970 deaths
Association football defenders
German footballers
Germany international footballers
Stuttgarter Kickers players